Hungry Hill is a 1947 British film directed by Brian Desmond Hurst and starring Margaret Lockwood, Dennis Price, and Cecil Parker with a screenplay by Terence Young and Daphne du Maurier, from the 1943 novel by Daphne du Maurier.

Plot
A feud is waged between two families in Ireland – the Brodricks and the Donovans – over the sinking of a copper mine in Hungry Hill by "Copper John" Brodrick. The feud has repercussions down three generations.

Copper John Brodrick wants to mine copper at Hungry Hill. Of his two sons, Henry is enthusiastic but Greyhound John is reluctant. The mine goes ahead despite opposition of the Donovan family.

Fanny Rosa flirts with both John and Henry. The Donovans lead a riot at the mine which results in Henry's death.

John becomes a lawyer and is the heir to the mine, but is reluctant to take over. He resumes his romance with Fanny Rosa.

Cast
 Margaret Lockwood as Fanny Rosa
 Dennis Price as Greyhound John Brodrick
 Cecil Parker as Copper John Brodrick
 Michael Denison as Henry Brodrick
 F.J. McCormick as Old Tim
 Arthur Sinclair as Morty Donovan
 Jean Simmons as Jane Brodrick
 Eileen Crowe as Bridget
 Eileen Herlie as Katherine
 Barbara Waring as Barbara Brodrick
 Michael Golden as Sam Donovan
 Siobhán McKenna as Kate Donovan
 Dan O'Herlihy as Harry Brodrick
 Henry Mollison as Dr. Armstrong
 Dermot Walsh as Wild Johnnie Brodrick
 Eddie Byrne as Hennessy

Production
Daphne du Maurier's novel was a best seller. Film rights were bought by Two Cities who assigned William Sistrom to produce. Brian Desmond Hurst was the director and it was decided to film on location in Ireland.

Background filming began in County Wicklow in September 1945. Studio filming did not begin until March 1946 in Denham.

The female lead was offered to Geraldine Fitzgerald but she was unable to get out of her US commitments. The producers approached Sally Gray who turned it down as she did not wish to grow old on camera. Margaret Lockwood played the role instead, once she finished with Bedelia. Lockwood's real life daughter player her daughter in the film.

Robert Cummings was mentioned for the male lead.

According to Dermot Walsh, Brian Desmond Hurst wanted Seamus Locke to play Wild Johnny but producer Bill Sistrom insisted on Walsh. "They had a bit of a barney over that", says Walsh. "After I made an exhaustive test, Sistrom called in all the girls from the front office, sat them down and ran the test. The girls got me the part!"

Walsh says the film took around five months to make. "Every shot was composed, they'd spend hours trying to get it as beautiful and as dramatically effective as possible."

Critical reception
The New York Times wrote, "the film's running time is about average, ninety minutes, but the narrative, for all its ample conflict, progresses so ponderously that it seems interminable ... The few moments of effective cinema in "Hungry Hill" are so fleeting as to be easily forgotten, but the sequence wherein a staid ball is turned into a lively jig session by the infectious music of a fiddler from the town is a bit of expert staging which you probably won't see duplicated again soon. The spontaneity and brilliant conception of this scene is almost sufficient cause to make one show more tolerance toward 'Hungry Hill' than it deserves."

Britmovie called it a "stirring Irish saga based on the epic novel by Daphne du Maurier."

Filmink magazine said the film "was clearly Rank's attempt at making a Gainsborough melodrama, only classy" and "all the ingredients are there – costumes, rivalries, feuding brothers – but the filmmakers stuff it" by failing to focus on one character or theme and lacking stars to partner with Lockwood.

References

External links
 
 
 
 Hungry Hill a Britmovies
 Hungry Hill at the website dedicated to Brian Desmond Hurst
 Review of film at Variety

1947 films
1940s historical films
British black-and-white films
British historical films
Films based on works by Daphne du Maurier
Films based on British novels
Films directed by Brian Desmond Hurst
Films about feuds
Films set in Ireland
1940s British films